Mark Stephen Hayes (July 12, 1949 – July 17, 2018) was an American professional golfer. He had three victories on the PGA Tour in the 1970s, including the 1977 Tournament Players Championship. He played in the 1979 Ryder Cup as a late replacement for Tom Watson.

Early years and amateur career
Born in Stillwater, Oklahoma, Hayes played collegiately at Oklahoma State University, where he was a two-time All-American. He won the Sunnehanna Amateur in 1972.

Professional career
Hayes won three times on the PGA Tour: the Byron Nelson Golf Classic and Pensacola Open in 1976 and the Tournament Players Championship in 1977. He also won the PGA Tour-sponsored Tallahassee Open in 1986 and three Oklahoma Opens.

Hayes had his best finish in a major championship at the U.S. Open in 1980, where he began the final round of play two shots out of the lead but shot a final round 74 to finish T6. He was also the first round leader at the 1975 PGA Championship, but finished T22. In the second round of The Open Championship in 1977, Hayes shot 63 at the Ailsa Course at Turnberry to establish a new single round record at The Open Championship by two strokes. The previous record of 65 was set by Henry Cotton in the second round in 1934 at Royal St. George's.

Hayes played in the 1979 Ryder Cup team after Tom Watson gave up his spot to be with his wife at the birth of their first child. Hayes  lost both his matches on the second day but won his singles match against Antonio Garrido on the final day, to help the United States to a 17 to 11 win over the European team.

After turning 50, Hayes joined the Senior PGA Tour. His best finish was T10 at the 2001 Siebel Classic in Silicon Valley.

Hayes was well known for his trademark bucket caps.

Business career
In the late 1980s, Hayes began preparing for a career in golf course design and construction. In 1990, he established a golf course design firm. His projects were built in Oklahoma and neighboring states.

Death
Hayes died on July 17, 2018, from early-onset Alzheimer's disease.

Amateur wins
1972 Sunnehanna Amateur

Professional wins (7)

PGA Tour wins (3)

PGA Tour playoff record (0–2)

PGA Tour satellite wins (1)
1986 Tallahassee Open

Other wins (3)
1976 Oklahoma Open
1988 Oklahoma Open
1993 Oklahoma Open

Results in major championships

CUT = missed the half-way cut
"T" indicates a tie for a place

Summary

Most consecutive cuts made – 10 (1974 U.S. Open – 1978 Open Championship)
Longest streak of top-10s – 1 (three times)

The Players Championship

Wins (1)

Results timeline

CUT = missed the halfway cut
"T" indicates a tie for a place.

U.S. national team appearances
Amateur
Eisenhower Trophy: 1972 (winners)

Professional
Ryder Cup: 1979 (winners)

See also
1973 PGA Tour Qualifying School graduates
1988 PGA Tour Qualifying School graduates
1989 PGA Tour Qualifying School graduates
1990 PGA Tour Qualifying School graduates

References

External links

Oklahoma Golf Hall of Fame Induction feature
Mark Hayes – 2017 Inductee Oklahoma Golf Hall of Fame (Youtube video)

American male golfers
Oklahoma State Cowboys golfers
PGA Tour golfers
PGA Tour Champions golfers
Ryder Cup competitors for the United States
Golf course architects
Golfers from Oklahoma
People from Stillwater, Oklahoma
Neurological disease deaths in Oklahoma
Deaths from Alzheimer's disease
1949 births
2018 deaths